This article is about music-related events in 1822.

Events 
March 16 – Marriage of Gioacchino Rossini and Spanish soprano Isabella Colbran.
Official date of the invention of the accordion by Christian Friedrich Ludwig Buschmann.  (This has been thrown into doubt by the discovery of an accordion apparently manufactured in 1816.)
The Royal Academy of Music was founded.
Johann Wenzel Kalliwoda became musical director to Prince Karl Egon II of Furstenburg.
Harpist Franz Stockhausen marries soprano Margarethe Schmuck.
Franz Liszt arrives in Vienna and commences piano lessons with Carl Czerny and theory lessons with Antonio Salieri. The latter writes a letter to Prince Esterhazy to advocate for Liszt's continued study in Vienna. On December 1, Liszt gives his first public performance in Vienna, sharing the billing with Caroline Unger. He plays Hummel's Piano Concerto No. 2.

Popular music 
 "Araby's Daughter" (song) w. Thomas Moore m. George Kiallmark.  The words are derived from Moore's "Farewell to Araby's Daughter" published in 1817.

Classical music 
Ludwig van Beethoven - Sonata op. 111 in C minor
Fernandino Carulli – 3 Nocturnes concertants, Op. 143
Mauro Giuliani – Serenade, Op. 19
Johann Nepomuk Hummel – Birthday Cantata for Goethe
Niels Peter Jensen – Flute Sonata, Op. 6
Friedrich Kuhlau 
Violin Sonata, Op. 33
Leichte Variationen über sechs Oestreichische Volkslieder, Op. 42
3 Sonatinas, Op. 44
Luigi Legnani – 36 Caprices, Op. 20
Franz Liszt – Variation on a Waltz by Diabelli
Ferdo Livadić –  Nocturne in F-sharp minor
Joseph Mayseder – String Quartet No.6, Op. 23
Felix Mendelssohn
Concerto for Piano and Strings in A minor
Piano Quartet No. 1 in C minor
Sinfonia for Strings No. 7 in D minor
Sinfonia for Strings No. 8 in D Major
Brizio Petrucci – Requiem Mass
Anton Reicha – Wind Quintet, Op. 99 Nos. 2, 5
Ferdinand Ries – Variations, Op. 105 Nos. 1 and 2
Pierre Rode – 24 Caprices for Solo Violin, Op. 22
Franz Schubert
Symphony no. 8 in B minor,"Unfinished"
Wanderer Fantasy
Der Wachtelschlag, D.742
Die Rose, D.745
Geist der Liebe, D.747
Am Geburtstage des Kaisers, D.748
Heliopolis, D.753
Jan Václav Voříšek – Impromptu

Opera 
Gaetano Donizetti – Zoraida di Granata
Giacomo Meyerbeer – L'esule di Granata
Franz Schubert 
Die Verschworenen, D.787
Alfonso und Estrella

Births 
January 8 – Carlo Alfredo Piatti, cellist (d. 1901)
February 14 – Betty Boije, Finnish-Swedish contralto and composer (d. 1854)
February 26 – Franz Strauss, horn player and composer, father of Richard Strauss (d. 1905)
February 28 – Nicolas Maline, luthier (d. 1877)
March 7 – Victor Massé, composer (d. 1884)
April 3 – Elma Ström, Swedish opera singer (d. 1889)
April 8 – Giuseppe Apolloni, opera composer (d. 1889)
April 25 – James Pierpont, songwriter (d. 1893)
May 27 – Joachim Raff, pianist, composer and music teacher (d. 1882)
July 22 – Luigi Arditi, violinist, conductor and composer (d. 1903)
August 15 – Wilhelm Rust, musicologist and composer (d. 1892)
October 13 – Carl Martin Reinthaler, organist, conductor and composer (d. 1896)
October 14 – Julie Berwald, singer.
October 15 – Kornél Ábrányi, pianist and composer (d. 1903)
December 3 – Korla Awgust Kocor, conductor and composer (d. 1904)
December 10 – César Franck, organist and composer (d. 1890)
December 16 – Charles Edward Horsley (d.1876)
December 22 – Charles Lebouc, cellist (d. 1893)
date unknown – Giulio Regondi, guitarist and composer (d. 1872)

Deaths 
January – Americo Sbigoli, operatic tenor (burst blood vessel)
February 2 – Jean-Baptiste Davaux, French violinist and composer, 79
March 2 – Hermann Uber, composer, 40
March 19 – Józef Wybicki, soldier-poet, lyricist of the Polish national anthem, 74
March 22 – Johann Wilhelm Hässler, organist, pianist and composer, 74/5
April 3 – Édouard Du Puy, violinist, singer and composer, 51/2
June 25 – E. T. A. Hoffmann, composer and author, inspiration for Tales of Hoffmann, 46
August 25 – William Herschel, British astronomer and composer, 83
September 8 – Joseph Karl Ambrosch, operatic tenor and composer, 63
October 16 – Eva Marie Veigel, dancer, 98
November 18 – Anton Teyber, pianist and composer, 66
December 28 – Albert Christoph Dies, composer and painter, 67

References

 
19th century in music
Music by year